is a Japanese voice actor and narrator affiliated with 81 Produce. His major roles include Felix Louis-Claude Mont d'Or in Argonavis, Ryugel Baran in Inazuma Eleven GO: Galaxy, Twinblade Arthur in Million Arthur and Kaito Tsukigami in Star-Myu.

Career 
Lounsbery was born in California. His family moved to Kanagawa Prefecture, when he was approximately one-and-a-half years old. He is three quarters Japanese. He graduated from high school when he was supposed to be in his first year and took university exams when he was supposed to be in his second year. He became a voice actor after attending high school, which was suggested to him by his co-worker from his part-time job. His first work when he was still in the academy was The Accidental Couple, his first official debut after entering his agency 81 Produce was Phi Brain: Puzzle of God. His first regular role was as Ryugel Baran in Inazuma Eleven GO: Galaxy. In 2015, his break-out role came when he was cast as Kaito Tsukigami in Star-Myu, in which he sang numerous songs. Lounsbery is active in various fields, such as competitive gamer and model. When he debuted in 2011, he was cast as Cristian in a film centered around the life of voice actors, titled "Kami☆Voice: The Voice Makes a Miracle". In 2013, he was part of 81 Produce's live-action unit "soffive". Currently, he is a member of Animate Channel's group 8P (or eight piece). In August 2016, Lounsbery won place in the National Best 8 Players at the official national convention of Dissidia Final Fantasy. He is the band vocalist of Stellagram.

Filmography

Anime series 
2011
Phi Brain: Puzzle of God as Male Student(ep 1)
2012
 Medaka Box Abnormal as Committee Chief(ep 12)
Sket Dance as Servant(ep 74)
2013
Gatchaman Crowds as Contributor(ep 9), Homeland Security(ep 10)
Inazuma Eleven GO: Galaxy as Ryugel Baran
 as Butler, Male Student, Glasses-wearing Man
2014
Buddy Complex as Garcian Bass(eps 2–5, 12, 13), Vajra operator(eps 7–10), Alliance maintenance member A(ep 11)
Buddy Complex: Into the Skies of Tomorrow as Garcian Bass(Second half), Mishima(First half)
Dragon Collection as Merchant A(eps 3, 4), Soldier(ep 5)
Duel Masters Versus as Staff
Free! -Eternal Summer- as Male Student(ep 1)
Haikyū!! (2014–2016)
Season 1 as Shinji Watari(eps 6, 7, 19–24), Sakurai(eps 15, 16), Kitagawa Daiichi member B(ep 1), Scorekeeping youth(ep 4)
Season 2 as Shinji Watari(eps 19–25)
2015
Cross Ange: Rondo of Angels and Dragons as Communication Soldier(ep 13)
Food Wars! Shokugeki no Soma as Schoolboy A(ep 19),Schoolboy C(ep 22), Schoolboy D(ep 21)
Omakase! Miracle Cat-dan as Kurokawa(ep 26)
Star-Myu: High School Star Musical (2015–2019)
3 seasons as Kaito Tsukigami
2016
Aikatsu Stars! (2016–2018)
2 seasons as Kanata Kira(eps 13, 17, 28, 32, 36, 37, 43, 45, 47, 50, 61, 69, 75, 79, 83, 87, 88)
Age 12: A Little Heart-Pounding as Kenta Mori(ep 2)
Kamiwaza Wanda as Tapioka(eps 11, 17), Mr. Morimoto(ep 20), Man(ep 22), Mutemin(eps 23, 24), Mr. Tony(ep 26), Koromin(ep 31), Ginga Hoshi Saburō(ep 35)
Luck & Logic as Kitaoka(ep 6)
Maho Girls PreCure! as Male Student(ep 34)
Reikenzan: Hoshikuzu-tachi no Utage as Un(eps 1–4, 9, 12)
Shin Atashinchi as Delinquent youth A(ep 25)
2017
Akiba's Trip: The Animation as Jiro Nishi(ep 7)
Hell Girl: The Fourth Twilight as Yoshinori Nagayama(ep 3)
Kirakira PreCure a la Mode as High School Student(ep 3)
Masamune-kun's Revenge as Shigeo Yamada(ep 1)
My Girlfriend Is Shobitch as Seiya Hoshikawa(eps 6, 7, 9, 10)
2018
Merc Storia: The Apathetic Boy and the Girl in a Bottle as Teufel (トイフェル)(ep 11)
2019
Actors: Songs Connection as Satoru Nijō(ep 9)
2020
Argonavis from BanG Dream! as Felix Louis-Claude Mont D'or(eps 11, 12)
Breakers as Shun
2021
Project Scard: Scar on the Praeter as Yamato Kai
2022
She Professed Herself Pupil of the Wise Man as Ratri (ラトリ)(ep 9)
Yu-Gi-Oh! Go Rush!! as Yudias Velgear

Anime films 
Aikatsu Stars! The Movie as Kanata Kira (2016)
Digimon Adventure: Last Evolution Kizuna as Ken Ichijōji (2020)
Digimon Adventure 02: The Beginning as Ken Ichijōji (TBA)

Original video animation 
Kyō, Koi o Hajimemasu as Student (2010)
 Beyond the Boundary: Daybreak as Youmu (2014)
Star-Myu: High School Star Musical (2016–2018)
3 OVAs as Kaito Tsukigami

Original net animation 
 as Sho Capital (2014)
 Bonjour ♪ Sweet Love Patisserie as Maximilian Takeda(eps 21–23) (2015)
 as Mars (2015)
Whistle! as Satoru Ogata, Vice Captain (2016)
 as Twinblade Arthur(ep 52, 54) (2018)
 as Nari Miyahara (宮原成) (2018)
  as Futa Kajiyama (2020–Present)
Lego Ninjago Shinryaku no AI-hen (レゴニンジャゴー 侵略のAI編) as Scott (スコット) (2020)
iichiko story: Kimi to Iru Keshiki (君といる景色) as Haruto Yamamoto (山本 晴人) (2021)

Video games 
2012
 (Nintendo 3DS) as Kyo Hanafusa (花房恭)
2015
 (iOS, Android, PS Vita) as Will Bartle (ウィル・バートル)
 Kobayashi ga kawai sugite tsurai ~tsu! ! Game demo kyun moe makkusu ga tomarana i~tsu (Nintendo 3DS) as Moyuyu's younger brother (もゆゆの舎弟)
 (iOS, Android) as Takuto Fargan (タクト・ファルガン), Restio Kohaku (レスティオ・コハク)
 (Windows, PS Vita, PS4) as Azazel (アザゼル), Klaus (クラウス), Farang (ファラン)
 (iOS, Android) as Clair Macbeth (マクベス＝クレアール)
2016
 (iOS, Android) as Kanata Kira (吉良かなた)
  (iOS, Android) as Richie (リッシュ)
 (iOS, Android) as Tyrant Nero (暴君ネロ)
 (iOS, Android) as Player voice (プレイヤーボイス)
 (iOS, Android) as Legus (レグス), Lion the Shishigami King
 (iOS, Android) as Shinji Watari (渡親治)
 (Windows) as Kagutsuchi (カグツチ)
 (iOS, Android) as Saturn (サターン), Mare (マーレ)
 (iOS, Android) as Basil (バジル), Lyon (リヨン)
Magic-kyun! Renaissance (PS Vita) as Charles (シャルル)
Puzzle & Dragons X: Gods Chapter/Dragons Chapter (Nintendo 3DS)
 (iOS) as Gan Ning (甘寧), Guan Ping (関平), Mi Fang (糜芳)
  (iOS, Android) as Core (コア), Egg (エッグ)
  (iOS, Android) as Yuki's father (ユキの父親)
 (iOS, Android) as Kotarō Kyūkan (球間小太郎), Silver (シルバー)
 (iOS, Android) as Hercules (ヘラクレス), Jo'chi Qasar (ジョチ・カサル), Kay (ケイ), Charles V (シャルル5世), Roland (ローラン), Gilgamesh (ギルガメッシュ)
Valkyrie Anatomia: The Origin (iOS, Android) as Alt Fail (アルトフェイル)
 (iOS, Android) as Mordred (モルドレッド)
2017
 (iOS, Android) as Saitō Hajime (斉藤一), Edgar Arketi (エドガー・アーケティ)

 (iOS, Android) as Self-Righteous Aten (独善的なアテン)
 (iOS, Android) as Raphael (ラファエル), Anubis (アヌビス)
 x  Special Collaboration Event (iOS, Android) as Teufel (トイフェル)
 (iOS, Android) as Male Protagonist (主人公〈男〉)
 (iOS, Android) as Renard Fascino (ルナール・ファシノ)
 (Arcade, PS4) as Twinblade Arthur (二刀アーサー)
2018
BORDER BREAK (PS4) as Kyle (カイル), Simon (サイモン)
 (iOS, Android) as Lucian (ルシアン)
 (iOS, Android) as Toa Qelsum (トア・キフェル)
 (iOS, Android) as Hisame (氷雨（ひさめ）)
 (iOS, Android) as Twinblade Arthur (二刀アーサー)
IDOL FANTASY (iOS, Android) as Chikahito Mitsuki (観月 智佳仁)
 (iOS, Android) as Kay (ケイ)
 (iOS, Android) as Miyabi Yotsuya (四ッ谷 雅)
 (iOS, Android, Windows) as Alfred Sisley (シスレー)
 (Arcade) as Caesar (カエサル), Crom Cruach (クロウ・クルワッハ)
2019
Gothic wa Mahou Otome (ゴシックは魔法乙女) as Pulcher (プルケル), Malé (マレ)
 (iOS, Android) as Natsuki Mikado (帝 夏月)
 (iOS, Android) as Kanae Kanzaki (神崎 夏向) (October 15, 2019 – May 31, 2021)
Quiz RPG: The World of Mystic Wiz (iOS, Android, Windows) as Sushi Cyborg Tetsu (スシサイボーグのテツ), Bean fairy Topuru (豆の妖精トプル), Tetsu's father (テツの父親), Dr. Osushi (オスシ博士)

(Windows) as Ryō Hasaba (枷場 亮)
2020
Argonavis from BanG Dream! AAside (iOS, Android) as Felix Louis-Claude Mont D'or (フェリクス・ルイ＝クロード・モンドール)
 (iOS, Android) as Shuusei (シュウセイ)
 (iOS, Android) as Faith Beams (フェイス・ビームス)
King's Raid  (iOS, Android) as Evan (エヴァン)
 (iOS, Android) as Drone 08 (ドローン08), CT2199W Fallen (CT2199Wフォールン)
MapleStory as Adele (Male)
 (iOS, Android) as Benon Yannick (ヴェノン・ヤニーク)
2021
 Brave Frontier ReXona (ブレイブ フロンティア レゾナ) (iOS, Android) as Regil (レギル)
 Dragon Quest X as Milore (ミローレ)
Paradigm Paradox (Nintendo Switch) as Hyūga (日向)
2022

 Fire Emblem Heroes (iOS, Android) as Hugh (ヒュウ)
 Quiz RPG: The World of Mystic Wiz (iOS, Android, Windows) as Astaroth (アスタロト)

Drama CD 
2014
 as Announcer (アナウンス)
2015
 as Taiga (タイガー・モスキトン)
2016
 as Rehm (レーム)
 as Tarō Nakamura (中村太郎)
2017
 EXIT TUNES PRESENTS ACTORS 6 as Satoru Nijō (二条 佐斗流)
2018
 (BLCD) as Tsukasa Yukihira (雪平 司)
 as Andrei (アンドレイ=ヴァジュニーチン)
 (BLCD) as Yoshirō Tanuma (田沼 芳朗 / よしろー)
2019
 as Frankenstein's Monster
ACTORS Extra Edition 8 as Satoru Nijō (二条 佐斗流)

JAZZ-ON! Sessions「First Cats」 as Ray Hoshino (星乃 レイ)
 as René Junker (レネ・ユンカー)
 as René Junker (レネ・ユンカー)
 (BLCD) as Yuzuru
2020
EROSION 1st single from CARNELIAN BLOOD ｢From a Spicy Peak｣ Voice Drama “Dangerous Brothers" as Yoru Kuzuriha (杠葉ヨル)
8P Unit Song Drama CD Vol.3 Original Drama「UNPERFECT」as Julius (ユリウス)
8P Unit Talk CD (8P ユニットトークCD) as himself
Arthur Lounsbery, Kento Ito's LI-PLAY! Recitation CD Spy's Act Vol.1 (ランズベリー・アーサー、伊東健人のLI-PLAY! 朗読CD Spy's Act Vol.1)
PROJECT SCARD Drama CD Prologue as Yamato Kai (甲斐 ヤマト)
PROJECT SCARD Drama CD Kazuma & Yamato as Yamato Kai (甲斐 ヤマト)
2021
8P Drama CD Heaven & Lost Vol.1 as Natsuki (ナツキ)
8P Drama CD Heaven & Lost Vol.2 as Natsuki (ナツキ)
HELIOS Rising Heroes Drama CD Vol.2 West Sector as Faith Beams
2022

 8P Drama CD: Hyakkiyakou Monogatari (8P ドラマCD「百鬼夜行物語」) as Mizuchi (蛟・青淵)

Audiobook 
 as Lev Leps (レフ・レプス) (2019)
Shiotaiou no Sato-san ga Ore ni dake Amai (塩対応の佐藤さんが俺にだけ甘い) as Sōta Oshio (2021) 
Gakuen-sha, Judgement to Seishun dorobo (学園者！～風紀委員と青春泥棒～) as Ichiki (風雲寺一騎) (2022)

Dubbing 
Television series
The Accidental Couple as Tae-won (2009)
Foyle's War
We Are Lady Parts as Ahsan (Zaqi Ismail)
Films
Descendants as Chad Charming, portrayed by Jedidiah Goodacre (2015)
Descendants 2 as Chad Charming, portrayed by Jedidiah Goodacre (2017)
 The F**k-It List (18歳の”やっちまえ”リスト) as Brett Blackmore, portrayed by Eli Brown (2020)
Animation
DC League of Super-Pets as The Flash 
Grojband as Corey Riffin

DVD 
 (2016)
 (2016)
 (2018)
 (2019)
KENN and Arthur's Nu Camp Vol.1 – 3 (KENN・アーサーのぬーキャンプ) (2020)
Tsumami Wa Shio Dake: On-location in Tokyo Bonfire Edition 2021 (つまみは塩だけ 東京ロケ・たき火編2021) (2021)

Live action 
 Kami☆Voice: The Voice Makes a Miracle as Cristian (2011)
 cafe*soffive (2013)

Radio
2015
 (October 6, 2015)
 (radio host) (August 26, 2015 – February 10, 2016)
 (October 12–16, 2015)

2016
 (radio host) (October 25, 2016 – present)
 (radio host) (July 2016)
(eps 133, 134) (June 9–23, 2016)

 (eps 24, 26) (July 16 – August 16, 2016)
 (eps 42, 43) (July 17–24, 2016)

2017
 (September 29, 2017)
 (May 27, 2017)
 (September 24, 2017)
 (ep 156) (May 24, 2017)
 (radio host) (February 1 – March 29, 2017)
 (ep 145–148) (December 6–27, 2017)
 (ep 33) (January 10, 2017)
 (radio host) (April 4 – June 20, 2017)
 (radio host) (July 7, 2017 – December 29, 2019)
 (ep 78) (May 17, 2017)

2018
 (ep 3) (March 23, 2018)
 (radio host) (May 7, 2018 – present)

2019
 (radio host) (October 28, 2019 – present)
JAZZ-ON! the radio (radio host) (December 5, 2019 – present)

2020
 Argonavis from BanG Dream! AAside Radio Royale Festival (アルゴナビス from BanG Dream! AAside ラジオ・ロワイヤル・フェス) (September 2020, February 2021)
U-nite! 81Wednesday ランズベリー・アーサー の夜明け詩 (June 2020)

Television and streaming programs 
2014
 (ep 11) (December 3, 2014)
 (March 2, 2014)

2015
 (MC) (January 13 – June 9, 2015)
 (December 15, 2015)
 (MC) (November 27 – December 9, 2015)
 LIVE B's-LOG (September 29, 2015 – January 26, 2016)
 (September 25, 2015)

2016
 8P channel (happy channel) (September 9, 2016 – present)
 DISSIDIA Final Fantasy:  (MC) (July 29, 2016 – present)
 (October 2, 2016)
 (August 11, 2016)
 (June 17, 2016)
: Impossible Voice Actor Audition (April 7, 2016)
 (October 19, 2016)

2017
 (MC) (April 27, 2017 – March 31, 2018)
 (February 11, 2017)
 (October 21, 2017)
 (July 16, 2017)
 (October 24, 2017)
  (ep 44) (May 25, 2017)
 (July 1, 2017)
 (June 4, 2017)
 (ep 4) (August 7, 2017)
 (August 31, 2017 – present)
 (June 24, 2017)
 (ep 1) (January 25, 2017)
 (January 29, 2017)

2018
 (ep 62, 63) (March 7–14, 2018)

 (February 8–18, 2018)
 (April 16, 2018)

2019
Arthur's Indie Game Story (アーサーのインディーゲーム物語) (MC)
 (MC)
LIPSS Innocent na Sasayaki (LIPSS～イノセントな囁き～) (main cast)
 (MC)

2020
 as Nyantarou the Former Stray Cat (元野良猫 にゃんたろう) (February 22, 2020)
 (ep 7) (January 9, 2020)
Project Scard TV (プロスカTV)

2021
 All Night Seiyuu Fuji (オールナイト声優フジ-ALLNIGHT SAY YOU FUJI-) (January 23, 2021)
Maison de Aoharu (メゾン・ド・アオハル) (September 2021 – present) (MC)

Multimedia project 
 as Kaname Bergman (バーグマン 要)
 as Kengo Hishinogi (菱乃木 賢悟)
 Visual Boy: Voice Actor side
Watashitachi wa Seiyoku ga Gaman Dekinai (私たち、欲しがり適齢期。) as Sora Ashida (芦田 宙)
Anime Beans (アニメビーンズ )
Live-action movie "Room Date" (実写ムービー「部屋デート編」) (August 17, 2018)
Chō! Anime Beans (超！アニメビーンズ) (September 14, 2018)
Lounsbery Athur no ima shichu (ランズベリー・アーサー の今シチュ) (May 11, 2019)
Koi shichu (恋シチュ)
comico
Voice comic "Mr. Kobayashi in the seat next to me" (ボイスコミック『となりの席の小林さん。』) as Akira Takizawa (滝沢 晃)
The Last Metal as Jun Hasumi (2021)
Yoshimaho Project as A-2 (2021)
Maison Half-Dozen (メゾン ハンダース) as Black Cat (黒猫) (2021)
Starry Palette (スターリィパレット) as Jin Natori (南鳥ジン) (2021)

Magazines and Photo Books 
8P Photo Book
Musical Star-Myu team Otori Photo Book
 (April 3, 2014)
VOICE Newtype No.058 (December 24, 2015)
 (January 15, 2016)
spoon.2Di vol.23 (February 27, 2017)
 (March 23, 2017)
spoon.2Di vol.26 (May 31, 2017)
 (October 10, 2017)
 (September 10, 2018)

Theatre

Musical 
 as Kaito Tsukigami at Zepp Blue Theater Roppongi in Tokyo (April 1–9, 2017) and Morinomiya Piloti Hall in Osaka, Japan (April 15–16, 2017)
 as Kaito Tsukigami at Nippon Seinenkan Hall in Tokyo (July 4–11, 2018) and Morinomiya Piloti Hall in Osaka, Japan (July 20–22, 2018)

Stage reading 
 81 Live Salon
 STUDIO La Neige:  (February 11, 2015) (Hajime)
 (January 13–18, 2015)
 (February 18, 2017) (K)
 (May 19–28, 2017)
 (November 25–26, 2017; April 28–29 and May 5, 2018)
 (November 11, 2017)
Sumaho o otoshita dakenanoni (スマホを落としただけなのに) (January 29, February 1, 2019)
Libra! 〜The Lie for Bracing you〜 (リブラ！〜the Lie for Bracing you〜) as Sōjirō Takamatsu (高松総二郎) (September 12–13, 2019)
 (October 19, 2019)
 (January 13–18, 2020)
 as Asa Takaoka (高岡亜沙) (February 20, 2020)

Discography

CD

Radio CD

Other performances

References

External links
 Official agency profile 
 Arthur Lounsbery at GamePlaza Haruka Voice Acting Database 
 
  

Living people
Japanese male video game actors
Japanese male voice actors
Japanese people of American descent
Male actors from California
Male voice actors from Kanagawa Prefecture
Year of birth missing (living people)
81 Produce voice actors